Edward Duffy may refer to:
Edward Duffy (athlete) (1883–1918), South African athlete
Edward Duffy (Fenian) (died 1868), Irish Fenian
Ed Duffy (1844–1888), baseball player
Eddie Duffy (1894–1986), Irish musician
Eddie Duffy, bass guitarist with Simple Minds